The 2007 Dellys bombing occurred on September 8, 2007, when at least 30 people were killed and 47 injured in a suicide car bomb attack on an Algerian naval barracks in the town of Dellys, 100 km (62 mi) east of Algiers. The blast was carried out by two attackers who killed themselves in the attack. Al Qaeda's north Africa wing (Al-Qaeda Organization in the Islamic Maghreb) said it was behind the suicide attack.

See also
 Terrorist bombings in Algeria

References 

Terrorist incidents in Algeria in 2007
Mass murder in 2007
Suicide car and truck bombings in Algeria
Terrorist incidents in Algeria
Islamic terrorism in Algeria
2007 in military history
Attacks on military installations in the 2000s
2007 murders in Algeria
Building bombings in Africa